On January 15, 2010, the Department of Defense complied with a court order and published a list of Detainees held in the Bagram Theater Internment Facility that included the name
Moez Bin Abdul Qadir Fezzani.

There were 645 names on the list, which was dated September 22, 2009, and was heavily redacted.

Moez Bin Abdul Qadir Fezzani is also the name the Department of Defense has given for a Guantanamo detainee.
Italian TV stations have reported the Guantanamo detainee Moez Bin Abdul Qadir Fezzani is scheduled to be sent to Italy to be tried on terrorism charges.

References

Bagram Theater Internment Facility detainees
Living people
Year of birth missing (living people)